Aenigmodes is a genus of moths of the family Crambidae. It contains only one species, Aenigmodes pentascia, which is found in Venezuela.

References

Glaphyriinae
Taxa named by Hans Georg Amsel
Monotypic moth genera
Moths of South America
Crambidae genera